Dowson was launched in Hull in 1807 as a West Indiaman. She quickly became a transport and then made one voyage to New South Wales. Later she traded with North America. She underwent two maritime mishaps that she survived, one in 1807 and one in 1821. Her crew abandoned her in the Atlantic Ocean on 19 October 1836.

Career
Dowson first appeared in Lloyd's Register (LR) in 1807.

On 18 February 1807 Dowson was in the Downs when a gale came up that wreaked havoc among the vessels there. Dowson lost her masts. On 30 March she was at Portsmouth on her way to Jamaica; she arrived at Jamaica on 19 June.

On 22 May 1815 Dowson, Gibbons, master, sailed from Deal, bound for the Cape and New South Wales. On 17 July Dowson put into Pernambuco to caulk her upper works. The stress of weather let to Gibbons cutting her cables and putting to sea. She sailed to Perahaba River to continue her repairs. As of 5 August she was still undergoing repairs there. She reached the Cape on 23 October and Van Dieman's Land on 24 February 1816. 
 
Dowson, Gibbons, master, arrived at Sydney on 7 March with merchandise. She left on 30 June, bound for Batavia.

On 7 November 1821, Dowson parted from her anchors and ran aground on the Hoyle Bank, in Liverpool Bay. She was on a voyage from Miramichi Bay to Liverpool. Dowson was refloated on 9 November and taken in to Liverpool.

In March 1824 John Boyes moved her registration to Whitby.

For some years in the 1830s Dowsons master was Gowland. When he traded with Chaleur Bay her backhaul cargo was lumber.

In 1834 Dowsons owners became Henry Boyes (40 shares), Elizabeth Boyes (8), Catherine Boyes (8), and Jane Boyes (8).

Fate
Lipton, of Rihibucto, rescued the 17 crew members. Dowson was on a voyage from Whitby to Saint John, New Brunswick.

Citations and references
Citations

References
 
 

1807 ships
Age of Sail merchant ships of England
Maritime incidents in 1807
Maritime incidents in November 1821
Maritime incidents in October 1836